Pterozonium picteti, is a species of millipede in the family Siphonophoridae. It is endemic to Sri Lanka.

References

Siphonophorida
Endemic fauna of Sri Lanka
Millipedes of Asia
Animals described in 1865